Don McKay may refer to:
 Don McKay (poet) (born 1942), Canadian poet, editor, and educator
 Don McKay (actor) (1925–2018), American actor, dancer and singer
 Don McKay (rugby union) (born 1937), New Zealand rugby union player
 Sir Don McKay (politician) (1908–1988), New Zealand politician
 Don McKay (film) a 2009 independent drama thriller film

See also
 Donald McKay (disambiguation)